Eri Ogihara (born February 12, 2003, in Japan) is a Japanese female curler from Karuizawa.

Personal life
As of 2020, Ogihara is a high school student.

Teams

References

External links

Living people
2003 births
Japanese female curlers
People from Karuizawa, Nagano
Sportspeople from Nagano Prefecture
21st-century Japanese women